Orły may refer to:

 Orły, Masovian Voivodeship, a village in east-central Poland
 Orły, Subcarpathian Voivodeship, a village in south-east Poland
 Gmina Orły, rural gmina (administrative district) in Subcarpathian Voivodeship, south-east Poland
 Orły-Cesin, village in  Sochaczew County, Masovian Voivodeship, in east-central Poland
 Orły ("Eagles"), the common name of the Polish Film Awards

See also
 Orłów (disambiguation)